John McCausland (1735 – November 1804) was an Irish Member of Parliament.

Early years
He was born in Strabane on 14 May 1735 to Oliver McCausland and Anne Jane Hamilton of Strabane.

Parliament
McCausland represented County Donegal in the Parliament of Ireland from 1768 to 1776.

Family life
He had married Elizabet Span, daughter of William Span in Ballmacove on 29 January 1757. They had 3 children: Oliver (born 6 November 1767), William (born 1759) and Catherine (born 1761). His daughter Catherine married William  Plunket, 1st Baron Plunket, the crown prosecutor at the trial of Robert Emmet, and later Lord Chancellor of Ireland.

Death
He died in November 1804, aged 69.

References

The House of Commons, 1790-1820, Band 3, page 837
Field Day Review 4, 2008 page 37
The Peerage, baronetage, and knightage of Great Britain 1856 page 120

Irish MPs 1769–1776
Members of the Parliament of Ireland (pre-1801) for County Donegal constituencies
1735 births
1804 deaths